The 2007–08 NHL season was the 91st season of operation (90th season of play) of the National Hockey League (NHL). It began on September 29, 2007, and the regular season ended April 6, 2008. The Stanley Cup playoffs ended on June 4, with the Detroit Red Wings taking the championship. The 56th NHL All-Star Game was held in Atlanta, Georgia, as the Atlanta Thrashers hosted the event at Philips Arena on January 27, 2008. The hosting by Atlanta was rescheduled from 2005, when a lockout cancelled the entire 2004–05 season.

League business
The league announced that the regular season salary cap would be going up for the third consecutive season. The 2007–08 salary cap is being increased by US$6.3 million per team to bring the salary cap up to US$50.3 million. The salary floor is at US$34.3 million, which is 71.5% higher than the salary floor during the 2005–06 season.
The season featured the debut of Reebok's new Rbk Edge hockey jerseys. This was the first league-wide uniform innovation in the history of any major North American professional sports league.
Seven teams (Boston, Tampa Bay, Vancouver, Washington, Ottawa, San Jose and Columbus) unveiled new designs prior to the season's beginning.

On March 1, 2007, the NHL announced the regular season would open on September 29, 2007, with the first of back-to-back games in London at The O2. They were the first NHL regular season games ever played in Europe. Both games featured the defending Stanley Cup champion Anaheim Ducks and the Los Angeles Kings (who are owned by Anschutz Entertainment Group, the same company that owns The O2).

The official average attendance per game was 17,625 per game. However, if the two games played at the O2 Arena are counted, the number is 17,309 per game.

On September 17, 2007, the NHL announced the first outdoor game in over four years would be played between the Pittsburgh Penguins and the Buffalo Sabres at Buffalo's Ralph Wilson Stadium, home of the National Football League's Buffalo Bills, on January 1, 2008. The event—known as the AMP Energy NHL Winter Classic—was the first time an NHL regular-season game had been played outdoors in the United States, and it set an NHL attendance record of 71,217 people. The only previous outdoor NHL game was the 2003 Heritage Classic played between the Montreal Canadiens and Edmonton Oilers at Commonwealth Stadium on November 22, 2003.

During board of governors meetings held on September 18, 2007, in Chicago, cities including Las Vegas, Kansas City, Houston, Milwaukee, Quebec City, Seattle and Winnipeg were discussed as possible expansion destinations. The NHL also discussed the current "unbalanced" schedule and voted on a new schedule format at a board meeting in November, so that all teams will play each other at least once and reduce intradivisional play in the 2008–09 season, in essence returning to the scheduling structure that existed in 2003–04, and would have existed in 2004–05. The sale of the Lightning and Predators teams were not completed for board approval.

Rule changes
A number of minor rule changes were introduced for the start of the 2007–08 season. Penalty shots can now be awarded when a player with the puck is hauled down from the centre line on in rather than from the opposition's blue-line as had been the case. Also, the interference rule was altered to allow for a major penalty and a game misconduct when an injury results. Another change affected faceoff placement: All faceoffs must be conducted at one of the nine dots painted on the rink.

Regular season
The New Jersey Devils began playing in their new arena, the Prudential Center in Newark, New Jersey. However, since the arena was not ready by the beginning of the season, they began their season with a nine-game road trip.

Inter-conference division play had the Northeast visit the Pacific, the Pacific visit the Atlantic, the Atlantic visit the Northwest, the Northwest visit the Southeast, the Southeast visit the Central and the Central visit the Northeast.

Michael Cammalleri of the Los Angeles Kings scored the first goal of the season against the Anaheim Ducks on September 29 in the opening game played in London, United Kingdom.

Richard Zednik of the Florida Panthers was severely injured after having his external carotid artery in his neck accidentally cut by the skate of teammate Olli Jokinen in a game against the Buffalo Sabres on February 10. Zednik fully recovered from the injury, but missed the remainder of the season.

The Anaheim Ducks and Ottawa Senators matched up for the first time since the 2007 Stanley Cup Finals on March 3, 2008, in Anaheim.

The Washington Capitals improved from 14th place in the previous season and last in the Eastern Conference during the first third of the 2007–08 season to finish as the third seed in the 2007–08 playoffs and winners of the Southeast Division. The turnaround was attributed mainly to the hiring of then-American Hockey League coach Bruce Boudreau, whose efforts won him the Jack Adams Award for the 2007–08 season.

The Detroit Red Wings won the Presidents' Trophy for finishing the regular season with the most points (115).

Fewer goals were scored in the regular season than in the 2006–07 season, with an average of 5.44 goals scored per game (6,691 goals over 1,230 games). Goaltenders combined for 161 shutouts.

Final standings

GP = Games Played, W = Wins, L = Losses, OTL = Overtime/shootout losses, GF = Goals For, GA = Goals Against, Pts = Points.

Tiebreaking procedures

Where two or more clubs are tied in points at the end of the regular season, the standing of the clubs is determined in the following order:

 The greater number of games won.
 The greater number of points earned in games between the tied clubs.
 The greater differential between goals for and against.

Playoffs

Bracket
In each round, the highest remaining seed in each conference is matched against the lowest remaining seed. The higher-seeded team is awarded home ice advantage. In the Stanley Cup Finals, home ice is determined based on regular season points; thus, the Detroit Red Wings had home ice advantage. Each best-of-seven series follows a 2–2–1–1–1 format: the higher-seeded team will play at home for have games 1 and 2 (plus 5 and 7 if necessary), and the lower-seeded team will be at home for the other games.

Awards

All-Star teams
First All-Star team
 Forwards: Alexander Ovechkin • Evgeni Malkin • Jarome Iginla
 Defencemen: Nicklas Lidstrom • Dion Phaneuf
 Goaltender: Evgeni Nabokov

Second All-Star team
 Forwards: Henrik Zetterberg • Joe Thornton • Alexei Kovalev
 Defencemen: Brian Campbell • Zdeno Chara
 Goaltender: Martin Brodeur

Player statistics

Scoring leaders

GP = Games played; G = Goals; A = Assists; Pts = Points; +/– = Plus/minus; PIM = Penalty minutes

Source: NHL.

Leading goaltenders
GP = Games played; TOI = Time on ice (minutes); W = Wins; L = Losses; OT = Overtime/shootout losses; GA = Goals against; SO = Shutouts; Sv% = Save percentage; GAA = Goals against average

Coaches

Eastern Conference
Atlanta Thrashers: Don Waddell
Boston Bruins: Claude Julien
Buffalo Sabres: Lindy Ruff
Carolina Hurricanes: Peter Laviolette
Florida Panthers: Jacques Martin
Montreal Canadiens: Guy Carbonneau
New Jersey Devils: Brent Sutter
New York Islanders: Ted Nolan and Al Arbour
New York Rangers: Tom Renney
Ottawa Senators: John Paddock and Bryan Murray
Philadelphia Flyers: John Stevens
Pittsburgh Penguins: Michel Therrien
Tampa Bay Lightning: John Tortorella
Toronto Maple Leafs: Paul Maurice
Washington Capitals: Bruce Boudreau

Western Conference
Anaheim Ducks: Randy Carlyle
Calgary Flames: Mike Keenan
Chicago Blackhawks: Denis Savard
Colorado Avalanche: Joel Quenneville
Columbus Blue Jackets: Ken Hitchcock
Dallas Stars: Dave Tippett
Detroit Red Wings: Mike Babcock
Edmonton Oilers: Craig MacTavish
Los Angeles Kings: Marc Crawford
Minnesota Wild: Jacques Lemaire
Nashville Predators: Barry Trotz
Phoenix Coyotes: Wayne Gretzky
San Jose Sharks: Ron Wilson
St. Louis Blues: Andy Murray
Vancouver Canucks: Alain Vigneault

Milestones
On October 3, in his first game with Montreal, Roman Hamrlik played in his 1,000th NHL game.
On October 7, Joe Sakic reached 1,591 points, moving him past Phil Esposito for eighth all-time in scoring.
On October 8, Chris Chelios played in his 1,550th game, moving him past Alex Delvecchio for eighth place on the career list.
On October 12, Jaromir Jagr scored his 1,533rd career point, passing Paul Coffey for 11th in all-time scoring.
On October 22, Bryan Smolinski played in his 1,000th NHL game.
On October 26, Alexei Kovalev played in his 1,000th NHL game, the third Montreal player to reach this milestone in October.
On November 3, Al Arbour coached his 1,500th game with the New York Islanders and earned his 740th win with the team. Both are NHL records for coaching a single team. At 75 years old, he was the oldest man to coach in an NHL game.
On November 10, Jeremy Roenick scored his 500th career NHL goal, becoming only the 40th player in the history of the league to do so, and only the third American.
On November 17, Martin Brodeur recorded his 500th career win, becoming only the second goaltender in the history of the league to do so.
On November 17, Glen Wesley played in his 1,400th NHL game, becoming the 10th defenceman to do so.
On December 20, Marian Gaborik scored five goals for the Minnesota Wild in a 6–3 win against the New York Rangers. It is the first time a player has scored five goals in a game since Sergei Fedorov did so on December 26, 1996.
On December 23, New York Rangers captain Jaromir Jagr recorded his 927th assist, passing Stan Mikita for 15th place on the all-time list.
On January 17, Markus Naslund played in his 1000th NHL game.
On February 9, San Jose Sharks coach Ron Wilson earned his 500th career win as an NHL head coach, becoming the 11th in league history to do so.
On March 12, Olaf Kölzig recorded his 300th win, becoming the 23rd goaltender to reach the mark.
On March 13, the Detroit Red Wings reached the 100-point mark for the eighth straight season, tying an NHL record set by the Montreal Canadiens from 1975–1982.
On March 22, Joe Sakic recorded his 1,000th assist on a goal by teammate Tyler Arnason, becoming just the 11th player to reach this mark.
On April 6, Keith Tkachuk scored his 500th career goal, becoming the fourth American-born player to do so.
On April 9, Joe Sakic extended his record for playoff overtime goals to eight.
On April 12, Chris Chelios played his 248th career playoff game, moving past Patrick Roy for most career playoff games played.

Debuts
The following is a list of players of note who played their first NHL game in 2007–08:

Last games

The following is a list of players of note who played their last NHL game in 2007–08, listed with their team:

See also
 2007 in ice hockey
 2007 NHL Entry Draft
 2007–08 NHL transactions
 56th National Hockey League All-Star Game
 AMP Energy NHL Winter Classic
 NHL schedule structure

References
 
Notes

External links

Hockey Database
NHL.com

 
1
1